Julius Jenkins (born February 10, 1981) is an American professional basketball player, who lastly played for Science City Jena of the Basketball Bundesliga.

College career
Jenkins played collegiately at Georgia Southern University.

Professional career
He signed a contract extension with ALBA through the 2010-2011 season after being named the German League's MVP in 2008.

Before joining ALBA Berlin, Jenkins played professionally for RCE Nürnberg, also in Germany, and Euphony Bree in Belgium.

In July 2011 he signed a two-year deal with Brose Baskets in Germany. After only one year in Bamberg the club decided to cut him.

In July 2012, he sign a two-year deal with the EWE Baskets Oldenburg in Germany. In July 2014, he re–signed with Oldenburg.

On December 19, 2015, he signed with the Montenegrin club Budućnost Podgorica for the rest of the season.

On August 23, 2016, he signed with German club Science City Jena. On March 6, 2017, he re-signed with Jena for one more season.

References

External links
 Euroleague.net profile 
 FIBA.com profile

1981 births
Living people
Alba Berlin players
American expatriate basketball people in Belgium
American expatriate basketball people in Germany
American expatriate basketball people in Montenegro
American men's basketball players
Basketball players from Florida
Bree BBC players
Brose Bamberg players
Jenkins, Julius
EWE Baskets Oldenburg players
Georgia Southern Eagles men's basketball players
KK Budućnost players
Science City Jena players
Shooting guards
Sportspeople from Broward County, Florida